The 16613 / 16614 Rajkot–Coimbatore Express is an Express train run by Indian Railways between Coimbatore Junction in Tamil Nadu and  in Gujarat. The train made its inaugural run on 15 August 1998.

Coach composition

The train has standard ICF rakes with max speed of 110 kmph. The train consists of 22 coaches :

 1 AC II Tier
 3 AC III Tier
 13 Sleeper coaches
 3 General Unreserved
 2 Seating cum Luggage Rake

Service

The 16613/Rajkot–Coimbatore Express has an average speed of 55 km/hr and covers 2217 km in 40 hrs 00 mins.

The 16614/Coimbatore–Rajkot Express has an average speed of 53 km/hr and covers 2217 km in 41 hrs 35 mins.

Route and halts

, 

Gallery

Schedule

Traction

Both trains are hauled by a Diesel Loco Shed, Erode-based WDM-3A / WDM-3D locomotive from end to end.

Rake sharing

The train shares its rake with 16617/16618 Coimbatore–Rameswaram Express.

References

External links
 16613 Time Table
 16614 Time Table

Transport in Rajkot
Transport in Coimbatore
Railway services introduced in 1998
Express trains in India
Rail transport in Tamil Nadu
Rail transport in Gujarat
Rail transport in Maharashtra
Rail transport in Karnataka
Rail transport in Andhra Pradesh